Albana Osmani (born 17 August 1980) is an Albanian TV presenter, philanthropist and television personality known for her appearance on Top Channel.

Biography 
Osmani was born in Tropojë and moved aged 13 to Tirana, where she went to high school. Later she hosted the Albanians Got Talent show, which made her popular in Albania.

References

1980 births
Living people